Leporinus santosi is a species of Leporinus found in the lower Rio Tocantins in Pará State, Brazil in South America. This species can reach a length of  SL.

Etymology
It is named in honor of Geraldo Mendes dos Santos, of the Instituto Nacional de Pesquisas da Amazônia in Manaus, for his contributions to the knowledge of the fish fauna of the lower Rio Tocantins due to his studies on anostomids and on the impacts of the Tucuruí dam on the environment.

References

Taxa named by Heraldo Antonio Britski
Taxa named by José Luis Olivan Birindelli
Taxa described in 2013
Fish described in 2013
Anostomidae